Svetlana Paramygina (sometimes Paramyguina) (born April 5, 1965 in Sverdlovsk, Russian SFSR) is a former Belarusian biathlete. Her international biathlon career began in 1983. In the 1993/1994 season she won the overall World Cup. The following year she finished second overall. At the 1994 Winter Olympics in Lillehammer. She won a silver medal in the sprint event.
After the 2000/2001 season she retired as a biathlete.

References
 
 

1965 births
Soviet female biathletes
Belarusian female biathletes
Living people
Sportspeople from Yekaterinburg
Olympic biathletes of Belarus
Olympic biathletes of the Unified Team
Olympic silver medalists for Belarus
Biathletes at the 1992 Winter Olympics
Biathletes at the 1994 Winter Olympics
Biathletes at the 1998 Winter Olympics
Olympic medalists in biathlon
Biathlon World Championships medalists
Medalists at the 1994 Winter Olympics